His Last Race is a 1923 American film starring Australian actor Reginald Leslie "Snowy" Baker. It was billed as a "thrill-o-drama" with a story written around action scenes.

Plot
A horse is about to take its last race. Gangsters try to ensure the horse does not win.

Cast
Rex (Snowy) Baker as Carleton 
Gladys Brockwell as Mary 
William Scott as Stewart 
Harry Depp as Denny
Pauline Starke as Denny's wife 
Robert McKim as Tim Bresnahan 
Noah Beery as Packy Sloane
Boomerang as himself, a horse 
Tully Marshall as Mr. Strong 
King Baggot 
Harry Burns
Dick Sutherland 
Alec B. Francis
Bob Kortman as henchman

Production
Charles Chauvel worked on the film.

References

External links

His Last Race at TCMDB

1923 films
1920s action films
American action films
American black-and-white films
American silent feature films
Films directed by B. Reeves Eason
1920s American films
Silent action films
1920s English-language films